The Sayavaneswarar Temple or Chaayaavaneswarar is a Hindu temple situated in the village of Thirusaikkadu [or Thiruchaykkadu or Chaayavanam] near Kaveripoompattinam or Puhar, Mayiladuthurai in Mayiladuthurai district of Tamil Nadu, India. The presiding deity is the Hindu god Shiva. The temple dates from the time of the Medieval Cholas. The Saivite Nayanmars have sung of the temple in their songs.

The Temple
Thiruvayyaru, Mayiladuthurai, Thiruvidaimaruthur, Thiruvenkadu, Chayavanam and Srivanchiyam are considered equivalents of Kasi. Like in Kasi, where the city is centered around Kashi Vishwanath Temple, the temples in these towns along the banks of river Cauvery, namely Aiyarappar temple in Thiruvaiyaru, Mahalingeswarar temple in Thiruvidaimarudur, Mayuranathaswamy temple in Mayiladuthurai, Chayavaneswarar temple in Sayavanam, Swetharanyeswarar temple in Thiruvenkadu, Srivanchinadhaswamy Koil in Srivanchiyam are the centerpieces of the towns.

Literary mention 
Tirugnanasambandar describes the feature of the deity as: 

Tirunavukkarasar describes the feature of the deity as:

References 

 

Shiva temples in Mayiladuthurai district
Padal Petra Stalam
Maadakkoil